María Esperanza Morelos Borja (born 29 September 1953) is a Mexican politician from the National Action Party. She  has served as Deputy of the LIII and LX Legislatures of the Mexican Congress representing Michoacán.

References

1953 births
Living people
Politicians from Michoacán
Women members of the Chamber of Deputies (Mexico)
National Action Party (Mexico) politicians
21st-century Mexican politicians
21st-century Mexican women politicians
Deputies of the LX Legislature of Mexico
Members of the Chamber of Deputies (Mexico) for Michoacán